Charles Marshall (18 January 1901 – 25 January 1973) was a British cyclist. He competed in the individual and team road race events at the 1928 Summer Olympics.

References

External links
 

1901 births
1973 deaths
British male cyclists
Olympic cyclists of Great Britain
Cyclists at the 1928 Summer Olympics
Place of birth missing